You Broke My Heart So ... I Busted Your Jaw is an album by Spooky Tooth, first released in 1973 on Island Records.  It was the first album to be released after the band re-formed, following their 1970 breakup.  Founding guitarist Luther Grosvenor did not rejoin the band, as he had joined Mott The Hoople as a guitarist, adopting the stage name of Ariel Bender.  Grosvenor was replaced by Mick Jones, who later co-founded Foreigner, while founding drummer Mike Kellie was replaced by Bryson Graham. The album was remastered and re-released on compact disc (CD) by Repertoire in January 2005, with a bonus track.

Track listing 
All songs written by Gary Wright, except where noted.

Side one
"Cotton Growing Man" – 4:39
"Old as I Was Born" – 4:40
"This Time Around" (Bryson Graham) – 4:08
"Holy Water" – 3:27

Side two
"Wildfire" – 4:04
"Self Seeking Man" – 3:47
"Times Have Changed" (Mick Jones, Wright) – 3:53
"Moriah" – 6:20

2005 CD bonus track
"Nobody There at All" (Post, Martin) – 3:44 (Alternate Mix)

Charts

Personnel
Spooky Tooth
 Mike Harrison – lead vocals, piano, harmonica
 Mick Jones – guitars, backing vocals
 Gary Wright – organ, backing vocals, piano
 Chris Stewart – bass
 Val Burke – bass, backing vocals
 Bryson Graham – drums, percussion

Other credits
 Chris Kimsey – engineer, mixing
 Phil McDonald – mixing
 Rod Thear – mixing, tape operator
 Klaus Voormann – cover drawings

References

External links
 

1973 albums
Spooky Tooth albums
Island Records albums
Albums recorded at Apple Studios
Albums with cover art by Klaus Voormann
Albums recorded at Olympic Sound Studios